The 2012 Colonial Athletic Association men's basketball tournament was held March 2–5 at the Richmond Coliseum in Richmond, VA to crown a champion of the Colonial Athletic Association. The tournament winner, Virginia Commonwealth University, received an automatic bid to the 2012 NCAA tournament

Seeding

Schedule

Bracket

Honors

See also
 Colonial Athletic Association

References

Colonial Athletic Association men's basketball tournament
Tournament
CAA men's basketball tournament
CAA men's basketball tournament
Basketball competitions in Richmond, Virginia
College basketball tournaments in Virginia